Cardale is a village in the Rural Municipality of Oakview, western Manitoba, in Canada.

History
Cardale had its start in the year 1907 by the building of the railroad through that territory. It was incorporated as a village in 1909, but it is longer an urban municipality. Cardale was named for John Cardale, a pioneer settler.

References

Former villages in Manitoba
Unincorporated communities in Westman Region